Eve Balfour (died March 1955) was a New Zealand-born British stage and film actress.

Selected filmography
 The Woman Who Did (1915)
 Jack Tar (1915)
 Five Nights (1915)
 Burnt Wings (1916)
 Cynthia in the Wilderness (1916)
 The Woman of the Iron Bracelets (1920)
 The Scarlet Wooing (1920)
 The Black Sheep (1920)
 Fantômas (1920)

References

External links
 
 

Year of birth unknown
Year of death unknown
New Zealand film actresses
New Zealand silent film actresses
British film actresses
British silent film actresses
British stage actresses
20th-century British actresses
New Zealand emigrants to England
New Zealand expatriates in England